It Hurts So Good is the second album by American singer-songwriter Millie Jackson.

Track listings
"I Cry" (Gary Byrd, Raeford Gerald)	4:12	
"Hypocrisy" (Millie Jackson, Victor Davis)	2:14	
"Two-Faced World" (Johanna Hall, John Hall)	2:50	
"It Hurts So Good" (Phillip Mitchell)	3:07	
"Don't Send Nobody Else" (Nick Ashford, Valerie Simpson)	3:22	
"Hypocrisy (Reprise)"	2:00	
"Good To The Very Last Drop" (Billy Nichols)	3:49	
"Help Yourself" (Brad Shapiro, Robert Pucetti)	3:05	
"Love Doctor" (Jackie Avery)	2:55	
"Now That You Got It" (Thom Bridwell)	2:33	
"Close My Eyes" (Billy Nicholls)	3:12	
"Breakaway (Reprise)" (Raeford Gerald)	1:56

Personnel
Mike Lewis – arranger, conductor
Raeford Gerald – arranger, producer
Brad Shapiro – arranger, conductor, producer
Lew Delgatto, Tony Camillo – orchestrations

Charts

Singles

References

External links
 Millie Jackson-It Hurts So Good at Discogs

1973 albums
Millie Jackson albums
Albums produced by Brad Shapiro
Spring Records albums